Ainhoa Murúa Zubizarreta (born 18 July 1978) is a Basque triathlete who competed for Spain.

Murúa participated in the second Olympic triathlon at the 2004 Summer Olympics.  She took twenty-fourth place with a total time of 2:09:27.91.  At the 2008 Beijing Olympics, she finished in 28th place, with a time of 2:04:48:07. At the 2012 Summer Olympics she came 7th with a time of 2:00:56.00.

References

External links
 Profile at Triathlon.org
 

1978 births
Living people
Spanish female triathletes
Triathletes from the Basque Country (autonomous community)
Olympic triathletes of Spain
Triathletes at the 2004 Summer Olympics
Triathletes at the 2008 Summer Olympics
Triathletes at the 2012 Summer Olympics
Triathletes at the 2016 Summer Olympics
People from Zarautz
Sportspeople from Gipuzkoa